JJ Tonks (born 25 May 2000) is an English rugby union player who plays for Bath in the Premiership Rugby.  He previously played for Northampton Saints.

References

External links
Northampton Saints Profile
ESPN Profile
Ultimate Rugby Profile

2000 births
Living people
English rugby union players
Northampton Saints players
Rugby union players from Gloucester
Rugby union flankers